Trades Union Congress or Trade Union Congress can refer to:

 Aden Trade Union Congress
 Guyana Trades Union Congress
 Intercolonial Trades Union Congress in Australia
 Irish Trades Union Congress
 Malaysian Trades Union Congress
 National Trades Union Congress in Singapore
 Scottish Trades Union Congress
 Trade Union Congress of Nigeria, TUCN, a trade union federation established in 1942
 Nigeria Trade Union Congress, NTUC, a breakaway of TUCN in 1960 that later merged to form the Nigeria Labour Congress
 Trade Union Congress of Nigeria, TUC, a trade union federation established in 2005
 Trades Union Congress in the United Kingdom
 Trade Union Congress of Eswatini
 Trades Union Congress of Ghana
 Trade Union Congress of Namibia
 Trade Union Congress of Tanzania
 Trade Union Congress of the Philippines